Isobel Scaife (1911–1985) was a British stage and film actress.

Selected filmography
 Old Faithful (1935)
 The Right Age to Marry (1935)
 Nothing Like Publicity (1936)
 Not So Dusty (1936)
 Busman's Holiday (1936)
 The Belles of St. Clements (1936)
 Twice Branded (1936)
 Nothing Like Publicity (1936)
 Pearls Bring Tears (1937)
 Why Pick on Me? (1937)
 Strange Adventures of Mr. Smith (1937)
 Silver Top (1938)

References

External links

1911 births
1985 deaths
British film actresses
British stage actresses
Actresses from Portsmouth